Ignacio Quirino (born January 11, 1985 in Montevideo) is a Uruguayan footballer who currently plays for Mushuc Runa in the Ecuadorian Serie B.

Teams
  Peñarol 2006
  Tacuarembó 2007
  Racing Club 2007
  Central Español 2008-2010
  Universidad Las Palmas 2010-2011
  San Andrés y Sauces 2011
  San Pedro Mártir 2012
  Mushuc Runa 2013–present

External links
 
 

1985 births
Living people
Uruguayan footballers
Uruguayan expatriate footballers
Peñarol players
Tacuarembó F.C. players
Racing Club de Montevideo players
Central Español players
Universidad de Las Palmas CF footballers
Expatriate footballers in Spain
Expatriate footballers in Ecuador
Association football forwards